Andrew Steele Fulton (September 29, 1800 – November 22, 1884) was a nineteenth-century congressman, lawyer and judge from Virginia. He was the brother of John H. Fulton.

Born in Waynesboro, Virginia, Fulton attended common schools as a child and went on to attend Hampden-Sydney College. He studied law in Staunton, Virginia, and was admitted to the bar in 1825, commencing practice in Abingdon, Virginia, in 1826. He moved to Wytheville, Virginia, in 1828 and became a member of the Virginia House of Delegates in 1840 and 1845. Fulton became prosecuting attorney of Wythe County, Virginia, and was elected a Whig to the United States House of Representatives in 1846, serving from 1847 to 1849. There, he was chairman of the Committee on Invalid Pensions from 1847 to 1849. He was not a candidate for reelection and instead continued to practice law. He served as judge of the fifteenth judicial circuit of Virginia from 1852 to 1869. Fulton died on November 22, 1884, near Austinville, Virginia, and was interred in the family cemetery by New River near Austinville.

External links

1800 births
1884 deaths
Members of the Virginia House of Delegates
Virginia lawyers
Politicians from Abingdon, Virginia
People from Waynesboro, Virginia
Whig Party members of the United States House of Representatives from Virginia
19th-century American politicians
19th-century American judges
19th-century American lawyers
Virginia circuit court judges